Mitre 10 is an Australian retail and trade hardware store chain. Operations are based on a cooperative system, where the store owners are members of the national group and each has voting rights. The chain name references the mitre joint. There are over 400 "Mitre 10" and its associated "True Value Hardware" franchises throughout Australia.

History

The move to set up a co-operative group of hardware stores originated from a meeting of seven men who would become Mitre 10's founders – Tom Molomby, Tom Danaher, Reg Buchanan, Jack Womersley, Ian Nisbet, Bill Davey and Bill Wilson – held at Buchanan's home in Balwyn, Victoria, on 29 June 1959.
This move occurred specifically to maximise funds and energy with regards to advertising and promotions and to demonstrate that independent operators offered service, advice and competitive prices.

The new company soon expanded operations, with fifteen New South Wales members joining the group by February 1961. Queensland soon followed with seven retailers, under the chairmanship of Arthur Scurr, joining the cooperative in January 1962, followed by a further 16 members from Newcastle in October the same year. With the company successfully operational in the three Eastern states of Australia by the end of 1962, South Australia and Western Australia soon started running their own state-based co-operatives, and attention turned to Tasmania.

In June 2004 Mitre 10 Australia opened its first "destination hardware" or "big-box" chain at Beenleigh, Queensland.

In late 2008 Woolworths and Mitre 10 Australia held talks on the potential acquisition of the company. The Australian Financial Review reported that Mitre 10 Australia had held talks with other companies since beginning to find a major buyer or investor, although in early 2009 Woolworths decided the company structure was too complex for a takeover. Mitre 10 Australia was believed to be in talks with Metcash. UBS analysts said Metcash had been on lookout for a "fourth pillar" for some time to add to its operations, and that Mitre 10 might be perfect.

In late 2009 Mitre 10 Australia announced that they were searching for a major investment or buyer. In November 2009, Metcash released a statement to the Australian Securities Exchange with a proposal for Metcash to take 50.1% in the Mitre 10 Hardware Group for A$55 million cash injection. The deal proposed giving Metcash the right to buy the remaining 49.9% in the company at the end of 2012 or 2013. In March 2010 98% of Mitre 10 Australia shareholders voted in favour of the Metcash bid. Metcash acquired the rest of Mitre 10 in 2012.

Store types
Mega was Mitre 10's "destination hardware," or "big-box," chain; it was designed as a one stop shop for big projects, to compete with Bunnings. The main focus of the Mega was customer service, it marketed itself as "All the help you need", stores have customer service attendants stationed in different departments of the store i.e., plumbing, trade building supplies (timber), paint, the majority of these have a trade qualification. Mitre 10 Australia opened its first Mega in June 2004 at Beenleigh, Queensland.

In 2007, seven Mega stores operated across Australia: one in Queensland, one in South Australia and five in Victoria. Mitre 10 Australia originally had planned to have 50 Mega stores open, or have store owners renovate from other store types, across the country in metropolitan and regional hubs by the end of 2009. As of August 2009, three stores had closed. The Ringwood, Victoria store closed due to financial difficulty, with the store employing over 130 people, while the Campbellfield, Victoria store was closed in March 2009 due to the building having structural problems, the store employed 54 people, with the closure staff were redeployed to other stores. The Modbury, South Australia Mega store was bought by Wesfarmers' Bunnings in January 2007, the store employed 100 people. Hardy's Mitre 10 Mega in Pakenham, Victoria being the only store redeveloped from a smaller Mitre 10 Home and Trade store, still trading, with plans to expand. As of 2021, that store has become a Bunnings. The Mega store in Lilydale, Victoria closed in late 2009, being the last Mitre 10 Australia corporate store. The first Mitre 10 Mega store to open, in Beenleigh, Queensland, is still trading and operational as of 2020.

Mitre 10 stores are painted in the traditional blue and white livery. As Mitre 10 stores are all privately owned, operators have the option of adding concepts to their store, such as a dedicated "GardenCentre" or "TradeCentre".

Sponsorships
From 1995 until 2000, Mitre 10 was naming rights sponsor of Larkham Motor Sport.

References

External links

Company website

Building materials companies of Australia
Hardware stores
Home improvement companies of Australia
Australian companies established in 1959
Retail companies established in 1959
Retailers' cooperatives
1959 establishments in Australia